East Bernard Independent School District (EBISD) is a public school district based in East Bernard, Texas, United States.

The district serves the City of East Bernard and the unincorporated area of Bonus. EBISD served Bonus since 1973.

In 2009, the school district was rated "academically acceptable" by the Texas Education Agency.

List of schools
East Bernard High School (Grades 9-12)
East Bernard Junior High School (Grades 5-8) 
East Bernard Elementary School (Grades PK-4)

References

External links
 

School districts in Wharton County, Texas